This article contains a list of people who appeared on the stamps of the People's Republic of China, commonly known as China. See also Stanley Gibbons Stamp Catalogue - Part 17 China.

History
Between 1949 and 1979, China's stamps featured 56 distinct people who belonged in four categories: ethical and mythical figures, revolutionary martyrs, political figures, and cultural figures. During the same time period, Taiwan had 57 distinct people on its stamps. Four people appeared on both China's stamps and Taiwan's stamps during the time period. They were Sun Yat-sen, the poets Qu Yuan and Du Fu, and Zhan Tianyou, who was the earliest Chinese railroad engineer.

On 1 December 1962, the  released a set of eight stamps in its second edition of a collection titled "Ancient Chinese Scientists". On 25 February 1994, the ministry published a four-stamp collection of its second edition of "Patriotic Democrats". The agency issued a four-stamp collection of its second edition of "Modern Chinese Scientists" on 25 May 2011. On 30 September 2014, it released a four-stamp collection titled "Patriotic Democrats". The ministry published the a four-stamp collection of its seventh edition of "Modern Chinese Scientists" on 8 May 2016.  noted the prevalence of centenarians appearing on the stamps.

B 
 Bethune, Norman (1960, 1979, 1990)  Canadian Physician, Medical Innovator
 Bei Shizhang, biophysicist and academician (1994)
 Bian Que (2002) ancient physician

C 
 Cai Chang (2000) President of All-China Women's Federation
 Cai Hesen (2001) Communist Leader
 Cai Lun (1962) Inventor of Paper
 Cai Shengxi (2002) Military Leader
 Cai Yuanpei (1988) Educator
 Castro, Fidel (1963) President of Cuba
 Chen Geng (2005) Senior General of Liberation Army
 Chen Jingrun (1999)
 Chen Qiyou (1994) Member of United front
 Chen Shutong (1994) Vice President of People's Political Consultative Conference
 Chen Yi (1991) Military Commander, Politician
 Chen Yun (2000) Leader of the Communist Party
 Chu Coching (1988) Meteorologist, Geologist
 Confucius (1989, 2000) Thinker, Social Philosopher
 Copernicus, Nicolaus (1953) Astronomer

D 
 Deng Enming (2001) Communist Leader
 Deng Xiaoping (1997, 1998, 1999, 2000, 2004) Paramount Leader
 Deng Yingchao (2004) Chairwoman of the Chinese People's Political Consultative Conference
 Deng Zhongxia (2006) Communist Leader
 Ding Ying (1990) Agricultural Scientist
 Dong Biwu (1986) President
 Du Fu (1962, 1983) Poet

E 
 Einstein, Albert (1979) German-born Theoretical Physicist
 Engels, Friedrich (1955, 1958, 1960, 1963, 1964) German Social Scientist, Philosopher

F 
 Fang Zhimin (1999) Military and Political Leader

G 
 Gao Junyu (2006) Communist Leader
 Nicolae Grigorescu (1977)
 Gong Laifa (龔來發), farmer (1995)
 Guan Hanqing (1958) Playwright
 Guan Xiangying (2005) Military Leader
 Guo Moruo (1982) Author, Poet, Historian
 Guo Shoujing (1962) Astronomer, Engineer, Mathematician

H 
 Han Yu (1983) Essayist, Poet
 He Long (1986) Marshal, Vice Premier
 He Shuheng (2001) Communist Leader
 Hou Debang (1990) Chemical Engineering Expert
 Hoxha, Enver (1964) Secretary of the Albanian Party of Labour
 Hua Luogeng (1988) Mathematician
 Huang Dao Po (1980) Spinning Engineer
 Huang Gonglue (2002) Military Leader
 Huang Kecheng (2005) Senior General of Liberation Army
 Huang Xing (1986) One of the Founders of the Kuomintang
 Huang Yanpei (1993) Politician

J 
 Jia Sixie (1980) Agricultural Scientist
 Jianzhen (1980) Monk
 Jiao Yulu (1992) Communist Party Leader
 , agricultural educator and agronomist (2016)
 Jin Xunhua (1970) Model of Revolutionary Youth
 Joliot-Curie, Frédéric (1959) French Physicist

K 
 Koch, Robert (1982) German Physician
 Kotnis, Dwarkanath (1982) Indian Physician

L 
 Lei Feng (1978) Soldier
 Lenin, Vladimir (1953, 1954, 1955, 1957, 1959, 1960, 1962, 1964, 1965, 1980) Leader of the October Revolution, Head of the Soviet Union, Theorist of Marxism–Leninism
 Li Bai (1983) Poet
 Li Bing (1980) Water Conservancy Expert
 Li Dazhao (1989) Communist
 Li Fuchun (1990, 2000) Vice President
 Li Jishen (1993) Millitaly Commander of Kuomintang
 Li Lisan (1999) Leader of the Communist Party
 Li Shizhen (1955) Physician, Pharmacologist
 Li Siguang (1988) Geomechanician
 Li Weihan (1986) Communist Party Leader
 Lian Xi (2006) Forestrist
 Liang Sicheng (1992) Architect
 Liao Chengzhi (1988) Communist Party Leader
 Liao Zhongkai (1987) Kuomintang Leader, Financier
 Lin Biao (1967) Military Leader
 Lin Boqu (1986) Communist Party Leader
 Lin Qiaozhi (1990) Physician
 Lin Zexu (1985) Scholar, Official
 Liu Bocheng (1992) Military Commander
 Liu Hui (2002) Mathematician
 Liu Hulan, a spy for the Chinese Communist Party whom the Kuomingtang executed. On 30 January 1977, 30 years after she was killed, China released a set of three stamps bearing her image.
 Liu Shaoqi (1983, 1998) President
 Liu Yingjun (1967) Soldier
 Liu Zhidan (2002) Military Commander
 Liu Zongyuan (1983) Writer
 Lu Xun (1951, 1962, 1966, 1976, 1981), writer
 Lu Yu (1997) Author of The Classic of Tea
 Luo Binghui (2005) Military Leader
 Luo Ronghuan (1992) Military Leader
 Luo Ruiqing (2005) Senior General of Liberation Army

M 
 Ma Xulun (1994) Educator
 Mao Dun (1986) Novelist, Critic, Journalist
 Mao Yisheng (2006) Expert on Bridge Construction
 Mao Zedong (1950, 1951, 1952, 1953, 1955, 1957, 1959, 1960, 1965, 1966, 1967, 1968, 1977, 1978, 1983, 1985, 1993, 1998, 1999, 2003, 2006) the founder of the People's Republic of China. One year after he died, on 9 September 1977, China published six stamps bearing his image to pay tribute to him.
 Martí, José (1953) Poet, Writer
 Marx, Karl (1953, 1957, 1958, 1959, 1963, 1964, 1965, 1983) Prussian Philosopher, Economist
 Mei Lanfang (1962) Opera Artist
 Mencius (2000) Philosopher
 Michael the Brave (1977) Prince of Wallachia, Transylvania, Moldavia
 Mozi (2000) Philosopher

N
 Nie Er (1982) Composer
 Nie Rongzhen (1999) Military Leader

P
 Pablo Picasso (1950)
 Peng Dehuai (1988) Military Leader
 Peng Pai (2006) Communist Leader
 Peng Xuefeng (2005) Military Leader
 Peng Zhen (2002) Leader of the Communist Party

Q
 Qiu Jin (1991) Revolutionalist of anti-Qing Empire
 Qu Qiubai (1989) Communist Party Leader, Writer, Thinker
 Qu Yuan (1953) Poet

R
 Rabelais, François (1953) Writer
 Ren Bishi (1984) Communist Party Leader

S
 Shen Junru (1993) President of the Supreme People's Court
 Shen Kuo (1962) Scientist, Statesman
 Smedley, Agnes (1985) American journalist, Writer
 Snow, Edgar (1985) American journalist
 Soong Ching-ling (1982, 1993) Madame Sun Yat-sen, President of the All-China Women's Federation, Honorary Chairwoman
 Song Jiaoren (1991) Political Leader
 Song Yingxing (2002) Scientist
 Stalin, Joseph (1950, 1953, 1954, 1955, 1964, 1979) General Secretary of the Communist Party of the Soviet Union's Central Committee
 Strong, Anna Louise (1985) American journalist
 Su Song (2002) Astronomer, cartographer, horologist, pharmacologist, mineralogist, zoologist, botanist, mechanical and architectural engineer
 Su Yu (2005) Senior General of Liberation Army
 Su Zhaozheng (2006) Communist Leader
 Damdin Sükhbaatar (1961)
 Sun Simiao, physician and writer (1962, 2014)
 Sun Tzu (1995) Author of The Art of War
 Sun Yat-sen (1950, 1956, 1961, 1966, 1981, 1986, 1999, 2006) Revolutionary and Political Leader

T
 Tan Kah Kee (1984) Singaporean businessman
 Tan Xinpei (2005) Opera Actor, Movie Actor
 Tan Zheng (2005) Senior General of Liberation Army
 Tang Feifan (1992) Microbiologist
 Tao Xingzhi (1991) Educator
 Tao Zhu (1988) Communist Party Leader

U
 Ulanhu (2006) Vice-President of China

W
 Wang Hebo (2006) Communist Leader
 Wang Jiaxiang (1986) Communist Party Leader
 Wang Jinmei (2001) Communist Leader
 Wang Jinxi (1972, 1974) Worker
 Wang Shusheng (2005) Senior General of Liberation Army
 Wei Baqun (2002) Military Leader
 Wu Youxun (1988) Physical Scientist

X
 Xiang Jingyu, a revolutionary whom Chairman Mao called an exemplary female leader. To commemorate International Women's Day, the ministry released two stamps on 8 March 1978 with the name "Glorious Examples for Chinese Women". Xiang's image was on one of the stamps.
 Xian Xinghai (1985) Composer
 Xiao Jinguang (2005) Senior General of Liberation Army
 Xiong Qinglai (1992) Mathematician
 Xu Beihong (1978=Painting, 1985) Painter
 Xu Deheng (1994) Leader of Jiusan Society
 Xu Guangda (2005) Senior General of Liberation Army
 Xu Guangqi (1980) Bureaucrat, Agricultural Scientist, Astronomer, Mathematician
 Xu Haidong (2005) Senior General of Liberation Army
 Xu Jishen (2001) Military Leader
 Xu Xiangqian (1991) Military Leader
 Xu Xilin (1991) Member of Guangfuhui (Restoration Society)
 Xun Zi (2000) Philosopher

Y
 Yan Jici (2006) Physicist
 Yang Hucheng (1993) Military Leader
 Yang Jingyu (2005) Commander-in-chief, Political Commissar
 Yang Kaihui, the second wife of Mao Zedong. To commemorate International Women's Day, the ministry released two stamps on 8 March 1978 with the name "Glorious Examples for Chinese Women". Yang's image was on one of the stamps.
 Yang Liwei (2003) Astronaut
 Yang Zerong (1970)
 Ye Jianying (1987) General, The Chairman of the Standing Committee of the National People's Congress
 Ye Ting (1996) Military Leader
 Yi Xing (1955) Astronomer, Mathematician

Z 
 Zhang Lan (1993) President of China Democratic League
 Zhang Xiaoqian (1992) Physician
 Zhang Yunyi (2005) Senior General of Liberation Army
 Zetkin, Clara (1960, 1980) German Politician
 Zhan Tianyou (1961) Railroad Engineer
 Zhang Binglin (1986) Philologist
 Zhang Heng (1955) Astronomer, Mathematician
 Zhang Sui (1955)
 Zhang Wentian (1990)  General Secretary of the Communist Party
 Zhang Yuzhe (1990) Astronomer
 Zheng He (2005) Mariner, Explorer, Diplomat, Fleet Admiral
 Zhao Shiyan (2001) Communist Leader
 Zhou Enlai (1977, 1998), the first Premier of the People's Republic of China. China released four stamps each bearing his image exactly one year following his death to commemorate him. On each stamp was printed the Chinese characters, "First Anniversary of the Death of the Great Leader and Teacher Chairman Mao Zedong."
 Zhou Peiyuan (2006) Physicist
 Zhu De (1952, 1957, 1977, 1986) Communist military leader, Statesman. One year after he died, on 6 July 1977, China published four stamps bearing his image to pay tribute to him.
 Zhu Yuan (1953)
 Zhuangzi (2000) Philosopher
 Nikolai? Zhukov (1958)
 Zuo Quan (2005) Military Leader
 Zou Taofen (1985) Editor
 Zu Chongzhi (1955) Mathematician, Astronomer

References

Bibliography 
 
 
 

People's Republic of China
Stamps
Philately of China